Intact can refer to:
 An entire building, generally in good condition not dilapidated or ruins
Intact (group of companies), a Romanian media trust
Intact (album) and "Intact" (song) by Ned's Atomic Dustbin
Intacto, a film
Entire (animal), describing an animal that has not been spayed or neutered
Genital integrity
IntAct, a database of protein interaction data
Intact Financial, a Canadian insurance company